Dafen Welfare A.F.C. is a Welsh football club from Dafen, a village just outside Llanelli in Carmarthenshire, Wales. For the 2020–21 season they will play in the West Wales Premier League, having previously played in the Carmarthenshire League Division One. The club play at Dafen Park.

History

For the 2020–21 season the club joined the newly formed Tier 4 West Wales Premier League.

Honours

 Carmarthenshire League Premier Division (Tier 1 of Carmarthenshire League)  - Champions (1): 1984–85
 Carmarthenshire League Division One (Tier 1)  - Champions (6): 1925–26; 1935–36; 1946–47; 1947–48; 1950–51; 1951–52
 Carmarthenshire League Division Two (Tier 2) - Champions (2): 1997–98; 2000–01 
 Carmarthenshire League Division Three (Tier 4) - Champions (1): 1974–75
 Carmarthenshire League Division Four - Champions (2): 1976–77; 1983–84 (reserves)
 Carmarthenshire Senior Cup - Winners (7): 1927–28; 1946–47; 1952–53; 1974–75; 1976–77; 1981–82; 1988–89 
 Carmarthenshire Senior Cup - Runners-Up (5): 1953–54; 1979–80; 2001–02; 2003–04; 2008–09
 Carmarthenshire League T G Davies Cup - Champions (2): 2011–12; 2013–14 
 Carmarthenshire League T G Davies Cup - Runners-Up (2): 2003–04; 2010–11 
 Carmarthenshire League Darch Cup - Winners (5): 1945–46; 1981–82; 2003–04; 2007–08; 2008–09
 Carmarthenshire League Darch Cup - Runners-Up (3): 1976–77; 1984–85; 2001–02
 League Shield (2): 1936–37; 1945–46
 West Wales Intermediate Cup – Winners: 2011–12

References

External links
Official club website
Official club Twitter

Football clubs in Wales
Carmarthenshire League clubs
Sport in Carmarthenshire
Association football clubs established in 1925
1925 establishments in Wales
West Wales Premier League clubs
Sport in Llanelli